Emilio Sala may refer to:

 Emilio Sala (painter) (1850–1910), Spanish painter
 Emilio Sala (sculptor) (1864–1920), Italian-born Ukrainian sculptor
 Emilio Grau Sala (1911–1975), Catalan painter